Godshem is a Goan Konkani word for Pudding, Sweetmeats in general  which literally means the sweet. It can include preparations with various ingredients like rice, dal, milk, coconut, nuts, ghee,jaggery and/or sugar. They are sometimes made using fruits and gourds.

External links
 Godshem

Goan cuisine